The Menihek Hydroelectric Generating Station is a conventional hydroelectric generating station at Menihek Lake in Labrador. The generating station, two 69 kV power lines and the distribution networks in each community form an independent electricity network, off the main North American grid.

Geography 
The station is just south of the Laurentian Divide between the Atlantic and Arctic drainage basins which delineates the Quebec–Newfoundland and Labrador border in the area. 
The average frost-free period lasts from mid-June to mid-September. The area receives on average  of precipitation, roughly divided between rain and snow.

The terrain in this remote area is rugged and the dam is only accessible by a narrow dirt road from Schefferville. A 2002 Hydro-Québec report described the road as in need of urgent repairs.

History 
The facilities, including Menihek Aerodrome, were built between 1951 and 1954 by the Iron Ore Company of Canada to meet the power requirements of its iron ore mining operations at the Knob Lake site, near the company town of Schefferville. After IOC closed the mine in 1982, it kept the generating station running for two decades. However, in the early 2000s, the mining company gave notice to the Government of Quebec that it would cease to operate the plant and electric network as of November 1, 2002. In a last-minute deal, Hydro-Québec agreed to pay for all charges incurred by IOC to run the money-losing network while the governments of Quebec and Newfoundland and Labrador and the Native communities tried to reach a deal on a mutually acceptable way to split the assets.

A milestone was reached by the two provinces and their respective utilities on December 14, 2005. IOC would sell all interests in the generating station and part of the transmission lines to provincially owned Newfoundland and Labrador Hydro (NLH), as is, for $1, while transferring its Quebec utility operations to Hydro-Québec for the same amount. Under the deal, the generating station would be operated by NLH employees, but it would be managed by a 4-person operating committee staffed by personnel of both utilities.

Under the 40-year contract, Hydro-Québec is responsible for any operation, maintenance and refurbishment costs of the network's facilities owned by NLH and agrees to buy a firm volume of 40 GWh/year at 3¢/kWh with the remainder at 2¢. Rates are adjusted to the consumer price index for the duration and NLH has the right to recall power and break the contract with a 6-year notice. The agreement was finalized on November 15, 2007.

Dam and powerhouse 

The Tshiuetin Rail Transportation shortline railway (formerly the Menihek Subdivision of the Quebec North Shore and Labrador Railway) connecting Schefferville and Sept-Îles uses the dikes to cross the area.

The powerhouse was designed to receive four generating units but only two were installed when the plant came on stream in 1954. Each turbine is coupled to a 5,000 kVA alternator. In 1960, IOC added unit 3, a 9,900-kW Kaplan turbine under a  head and its 12,000 kVA alternator.

Aerodrome

Menihek Aerodrome is an abandoned airport located on the east cost of Menihek Lake, Labrador, Canada.

History
The airport was built between 1951 and 1952 by the Iron Ore Company of Canada to service the Menihek Hydroelectric Generating Station built to meet the power requirements of its iron ore mining operations at the Knob Lake site, near the company town of Schefferville.

Accidents and incidents

On 28 July 1953 an Avro 683 Lancaster (registration CF-GBA) of World-Wide Airways crashed upon landing while on a cargo flight from Sept-Îles Airport. The airplane was carrying a cargo of 8100 litres of diesel, 1135 litres of gasoline, and 3000 litres of avgas. The approach was performed in strong crosswinds and after landing the airplane veered out of control and collided with rocks at the end of the runway. Both pilots evacuated without injury while the aircraft caught on fire and was destroyed.

See also 

 List of electrical generating stations in Newfoundland and Labrador
 Churchill Falls Generating Station
 Labrador boundary dispute
 History of Hydro-Québec

Notes

Works cited 
 

 

Dams completed in 1954
Energy infrastructure completed in 1954
Hydroelectric power stations in Newfoundland and Labrador
Run-of-the-river power stations
Newfoundland and Labrador Hydro
Hydro-Québec
Defunct airports in Newfoundland and Labrador